Kortrijk is a hamlet in the Dutch province of Utrecht. It is a part of the municipality of Stichtse Vecht and lies about 10 km northwest of Utrecht.

The hamlet was first mentioned in 1217 as Kurtryke, and was named after Kortrijk in Belgium. It started as a peat excavation colony probably in the 11th century. The postal authorities have placed Kortrijk under Breukelen. The hamlet does not have place name signs. In 1840, it was home to 32 people.

References

Populated places in Utrecht (province)
Stichtse Vecht